Forgotten is a 1933 American Pre-Code film directed by Richard Thorpe.

Plot summary
Retired Papa Strauss, a widower, who has been a successful dye manufacturer, is being shifted around from one married-son's home to the other, and is not welcome at all because his daughters-in-law object to his smelly pipe smoking. Finally the family tucks him 'out of sight and out of mind' into a nursing home, with very little 'honor thy father' thought given to it. However, unmarried daughter, Lena, who loves her father dearly, with help from an inheritance from her uncle, and her chemist fiancée, who has new patented technology, sets up a new dye works with her father as head. They make a home for him. The new company steals business from the sons' company and finally the father has to bail them out. The sons and their wives attitudes finally change.

Cast
Lee Kohlmar as Papa Strauss
June Clyde as Lena Strauss
William Collier Jr. as Joseph Meyers
Leon Ames as Louie Strauss
Selmer Jackson as Hans Strauss
Natalie Moorhead as Myrtle Strauss
Natalie Kingston as May Strauss
Otto Lederer as Uncle Adolph
Tom Ricketts as Mr. Johnson

External links

1933 films
American romantic drama films
1930s English-language films
American black-and-white films
1933 romantic drama films
Films directed by Richard Thorpe
Chesterfield Pictures films
1930s American films